YL Ventures is an American-Israeli venture capital firm that specializes in seed stage cybersecurity investments.

Investment Firm
YL Ventures is a seed-stage venture capital firm. The company’s managing partner Yoav Leitersdorf who founded the firm with John Quigley in 2007, along with Israel and U.S. partners Ofer Schreiber and John Brennan. Current partners also include Sharon Seeman and Michael Cortez. The firm has headquarters in San Francisco and Tel Aviv. A main focus of YL Ventures is to introduce Israeli cybersecurity start-ups to the American market and develop a U.S. customer base.

In 2018, YL Ventures established its Venture Advisory Board. As of 2021, the Venture Advisory Board had included northward of 100 global CISOs and cybersecurity executives from Fortune 100 companies, that assist YL Ventures in vetting investments and provide ideation support before the investment occurs.

In 2019, YL Ventures inaugurated a CISO-in-Residence role. Roger Hale served as YL Ventures’ first CISO-in-Residence. In 2020, Sounil Yu took the role and in 2021, Ryan Gurney replaced him. The CISO-in-Residence for 2022 is Frank Kim.

Finances
As of 2020, YL Ventures manages over $300 million across 4 funds, including a $135 million fund raised in 2019 and a $75 million fund raised in 2017. By 2023 this had increased to $800 million across 5 funds.

Exits

References

2007 establishments in California
Israeli investors
Venture capital firms of Israel
2007 establishments in Israel